Venkatagiri Assembly constituency is a constituency of the Andhra Pradesh Legislative Assembly, India. It is one of the 7 constituencies in Tirupati district.

Anam Ramanarayana Reddy of Yuvajana Sramika Rythu Congress Party is currently representing the constituency.

Overview
It is part of the Tirupati Lok Sabha constituency along with another six Vidhan Sabha segments, namely,  Gudur, Sullurpeta in Tirupati district and Tirupati, Srikalahasti, Satyavedu in Tirupati  district.
On April 4th 2022, the government of Andhra Pradesh had formed new districts at that time, the Sarvepalli Assembly Constituency and Rapur Town and Mandal and Sydapuram and Kaluvaya Mandals remain in SPSR Nellore District. Dakkili, Balayapalli and Venkatagiri Mandals are merged into Tirupati district.

Mandals

Members of Legislative Assembly Venkatagiri

Election results

Assembly elections 1952

Assembly Elections 2004

Assembly Elections 2009

Assembly elections 2014

Assembly Elections 2019

See also
 List of constituencies of Andhra Pradesh Vidhan Sabha

References

Assembly constituencies of Andhra Pradesh